El Koubba Mosque  or Mosque of the Dome is a small mosque built in the 11th century in the medina of Tunis. It is located at 41 Tourbet El Bey Street.

History 
According to the panel at the entrance of the mosque, it was built in the 11th century. It is known as the place where the historiographer and historian Ibn Khaldun did his studies and researches.

Description 
The entrance of the mosque is topped by a hemispheric dome with a clerestory that was built on top of an hexagonal tholobate.

The prayer room was probably constructed after the entrance. It has three naves and two bays divided by two columns with Corinthian capitals.

References 

Mosques in Tunis
11th-century mosques